Sedley Joseph (4 December 1939 – 8 June 2020) was a Trinidad and Tobago footballer.

References

1939 births
2020 deaths
Trinidad and Tobago footballers
Trinidad and Tobago international footballers
Association football midfielders
Pan American Games medalists in football
Pan American Games bronze medalists for Trinidad and Tobago
Footballers at the 1967 Pan American Games
Medalists at the 1967 Pan American Games